Isaac Evans may refer to:
 Isaac Newton Evans (1827–1901), member of the U.S. House of Representatives from Pennsylvania
 Isaac C. Evans (1879–?), member of the Wisconsin State Assembly
 Isaac Evans (trade unionist) (1847–1897), Welsh trade union leader and politician
 Isaac H. Evans, a two-masted schooner berthed in Rockland, Maine